Helian Bobo (381–425), né Liu Bobo (劉勃勃), courtesy name Qujie (屈孑), formally Emperor Wulie of Xia (夏武烈帝), was the founding emperor of the Xiongnu-led Hu Xia dynasty of China. He is generally considered to be an extremely cruel ruler, one who betrayed every benefactor whom he had, and whose thirst for killing was excessive even for the turbulent times that he was in.  He built an impressive capital for his state at Tongwancheng (統萬城, in modern Yulin, Shaanxi) that remained difficult to besiege, even hundreds of years later during the Five Dynasties and Ten Kingdoms period.  (Confusingly, the Book of Wei refers to him as Helian Qugai (赫連屈丐), based on a derogatory term that Emperor Taiwu of Northern Wei used to refer to him.)

Early life 

Liu Bobo was born in 381, when his father Liu Weichen (劉衛辰) was an important Xiongnu chief and a vassal of Former Qin.  It is not known whether his mother Lady Fu was Liu Weichen's wife or concubine.  He was one of Liu Weichen's younger sons.  After Former Qin collapsed in light of various rebellions after its emperor Fu Jiān's defeat at the Battle of Fei River in 383, Liu Weichen took control of what is now part of Inner Mongolia south of the Yellow River and extreme northern Shaanxi, and while he nominally submitted to both Later Qin and Western Yan as a vassal, he was actually a powerful independent ruler.  However, in 391, he sent his son Liu Zhilidi (劉直力鞮 /conf. Chuvash Çăлтăр) to attack Northern Wei's prince Tuoba Gui, and Tuoba Gui not only defeated Liu Zhilidi, but crossed the Yellow River to attack Liu Weichen's capital Yueba (悅拔, in modern Ordos, Inner Mongolia), capturing it and forcing Liu Weichen and Liu Zhilidi to flee.  The next day, Liu Weichen was killed by his subordinates, and Liu Zhilidi was captured.  Tuoba Gui seized Liu Weichen's territory and people and slaughtered his clan.

However, Liu Bobo escaped and fled to the Xuegan (薛干) tribe, whose chief, Tai Xifu (太悉伏), refused to turn him over despite Northern Wei's demands.  Instead, Tai delivered Liu Bobo to the Xianbei tribal chief Mo Yigan (沒奕干) the Duke of Gaoping, a Later Qin vassal, and Mo Yigan not only gave Liu Bobo refuge but also married one of his daughters to Liu Bobo.  Liu Bobo, from that point on, became highly dependent on his father-in-law.  (Meanwhile, in 393, Tuoba Gui, because of Tai Xifu's refusal to deliver Liu Bobo to him, attacked Tai and slaughtered his people, although Tai himself escaped and fled to Later Qin.)  Little is known about Liu Bobo's life during the following years.  In 402, Tuoba Gui's brother Tuoba Zun (拓拔遵) the Prince of Changshan attacked Mo's homebase of Gaoping (高平, in modern Guyuan, Ningxia), and Mo was forced to flee to Later Qin, abandoning his own people, who were scattered about, although later Later Qin recaptured Gaoping and gave that city back to Mo.

Sometime before 407, Liu Bobo, who had become known for being handsome, able to speak well, alert, and intelligent, came to the attention of Later Qin's emperor Yao Xing.  Yao Xing was so impressed by Liu Bobo's abilities when he met Liu Bobo that he wanted to make him a major general to defend against Northern Wei.  Yao Xing's brother Yao Yong (姚邕), however, spoke against it, believing Liu Bobo to be untrustworthy, stating:

 Liu Bobo is arrogant toward his superiors and elders.  He is cruel to his subordinates and associates.  He is also greedy, treacherous, lacking in love, and inattentive to friendships.  He changes his attitude quickly and abandons things quickly.  If you overly trust and favor this type of person, he will surely create a disaster.

Yao Xing initially, at Yao Yong's counsel, did not give Liu Bobo a commission, but eventually was so seduced by his talent that he made him a general and the Duke of Wuyuan, giving him the responsibility of defending Shuofang (朔方, in modern Ordos).

In 407, after suffering a number of losses against Northern Wei, Yao Xing decided to make peace with Northern Wei.  Upon hearing this, Liu Bobo became angry, because his father had been killed by Northern Wei, and he planned rebellion.  He therefore forcibly seized the horses that Yujiulü Shelun (郁久閭社崙), the khan of Rouran, had recently offered to Yao Xing as a tribute, and then made a surprise attack on his father-in-law Mo Yigan, capturing Gaoping and killing Mo, seizing his troops.  He then declared himself a descendant of Yu the Great, the founder of Xia Dynasty, and named his state Xia.  He claimed the title "Heavenly King" (Tian Wang).

Early reign 

Despite Liu Bobo's stated hatred for Northern Wei, he concentrated his efforts on undermining Later Qin, continually harassing Later Qin's northern territories and draining Later Qin's resources.  He therefore did not settle in a capital city; rather, he roved about with his mobile cavalry, constantly looking for Later Qin cities to pillage.

Also in 407, Liu Bobo sought marriage with a daughter of the Southern Liang prince Tufa Rutan, but Tufa Rutan refused.  In anger, Liu Bobo launched a punitive raid against Southern Liang but then retreated. Tufa Rutan gave chase and, believing that he greatly outpowered Liu Bobo, was careless in his military actions. Liu Bobo led him into a canyon and then blocked the exit with ice and wagons, and then ambushed him—and the defeat was such that it was said that 60% to 70% of Southern Liang's famed officials and generals died in the battle. Tufa Rutan barely escaped capture.

In 408, Yao Xing sent his general Qi Nan (齊難) to launch a major attack on Liu Bobo.  Liu Bobo initially withdraw to let Qi believe that he feared Qi, and Liu Bobo made a surprise counter-attack and captured Qi.  Subsequently, much of Later Qin's northern territories fell into Xia hands.

In 409, Yao Xing himself launched an attack on Liu Bobo, but when he reached Ercheng (貳城, in modern Yan'an, Shaanxi), he was nearly trapped by Liu Bobo, and escaped only after major casualties.  This defeat forced Yao Xing to cancel a mission, commanded by his general Yao Qiang (姚強), to try to save Southern Yan from being destroyed by Jin's north expedition.  (Without Later Qin aid, Southern Yan fell in 410.)  For the next several years, Xia and Later Qin forces battled constantly, often inconclusively, but with the wars becoming much more costly to Later Qin than Xia, with Southern Liang and Western Qin no longer being willing to be Later Qin vassals as a result.  In 412, when Western Qin's prince Qifu Gangui was assassinated by his nephew Qifu Gongfu (乞伏公府), Liu Bobo considered attacking Western Qin despite its status as an ally, but at the counsel of his advisor Wang Maide (王買德) did not do so.

By 413, Liu Bobo finally resolved to build a capital—one that he wanted to make absolutely impenetrable.  He commissioned his cruel general Chigan Ali (叱干阿利) as the chief architect of the capital, which he named Tongwan—because, as he stated, he wanted to unite China and be the lord of 10,000 states.  ("Tong" means "unite," while "wan" means 10,000.)  Chigan ordered that the soil used in constructing the wall be steamed, so that it would be hardened and difficult to attack, and he often tested the walls during its construction; if an iron wedge were able to insert even one inch deep into the wall, the workmen who were in charge of that section of wall would be executed, and their bodies would be stuffed into the wall.  Further, Liu Bobo himself ordered that when weapons and armors are made, that some of the metalsmiths would be executed—because his orders were, for example, that arrows should be shot at armors; if the arrows could penetrate the armors, the smiths who forged the armors would be executed, and if the arrows could not penetrate the armors, then the smiths who made the arrows would be executed.  As a result of this bloodshed, however, Tongwan became a highly defensible city, and the weapons and armors that he had were all of exceedingly high quality.

Also in 413, Liu Bobo believed that his family name should be changed—since his ancestors took on the Liu family name from the Han Dynasty imperial house, believing that one of their female ancestors was a Han princess, but Liu Bobo believed this to be improper.  He therefore changed his family name to Helian—intending it to mean that his might was so great that it would, alas (赫 hè) be connected (連 lián) to the heavens.  He also ordered the nobles to change their family name to Tiefa (鐵伐), intending it to mean that they were as strong as iron (鐵 tiě) and be able to attack (伐 fá) others.

In 414, Helian Bobo created his wife Lady Liang "Heavenly Princess."  (No further reference to the fate of his wife, Lady Mo, was recorded in history, after he killed her father.)  He created his son Helian Gui (赫連璝) crown prince, and created his other sons dukes.

In 415, Helian Bobo entered into an alliance with Juqu Mengxun, the prince of Northern Liang.

In 416, with Later Qin, now under the rule of Yao Xing's son Yao Hong, under a major attack by the Jin general Liu Yu, Helian Bobo believed that Later Qin would fall to Jin, but that Jin would not be easily able to hold Later Qin's capital region -- Guanzhong.  He therefore intensified his own attacks on Later Qin as well, and preparing to use the opportunity of Later Qin's destruction to seize more territory.  As Later Qin neared destruction, Helian Bobo seized its western territory, centering Anding (安定, in modern Pingliang, Gansu), and then prepared for an eventual confrontation with Jin forces, which destroyed Later Qin in 417 and captured its capital Chang'an.

In winter 417, Liu Yu, intent on wanting to seize the Jin throne, left Chang'an under the command of his 11-year-old son Liu Yizhen (劉義真), and while he left several able generals to assist Liu Yizhen, those generals soon conflicted with each other and were killing each other—and eventually, Liu Yizhen, believing that the main assistant whom Liu Yu had left him, Wang Xiu (王脩), was about to rebel, had Wang executed.  Meanwhile, Helian Bobo sent his crown prince Helian Gui, another son Helian Chang, and Wang Maide to command armies south, not initially engaging Jin forces but isolating Chang'an from the rest of Jin territory—a task made easier when Liu Yizhen recalled Jin forces near Chang'an all to Chang'an.  Liu Yu, hearing this, sent his general Zhu Lingshi (朱齡石) to replace Liu Yizhen and recalled Liu Yizhen, but as soon as Liu Yizhen and his troops left Chang'an, they were intercepted and crushed by Xia forces under Helian Gui.  Liu Yizhen barely escaped, but the vast majority of the army was captured.  Helian Bobo stacked the skulls of the Jin dead into a hill-like structure.  Meanwhile, the people of Chang'an, who were angry that Liu Yizhen's forces pillaged the city before leaving, expelled Zhu, allowing Helian Bobo to enter Chang'an easily.  Helian Bobo then claimed the title of emperor.

Late reign 

Most of Helian Bobo's officials suggested that he move the capital to Chang'an, but he, believing that Tongwan was in a better position to defend against Northern Wei, refused and kept his capital at Tongwan, leaving Helian Gui in charge of Chang'an as viceroy.

The campaign against Jin showcased Helian Bobo's abilities, but at this time, he also grew increasingly cruel.  He was described by traditional historians in this way:

 He was arrogant and cruel, treating the people like wild plants and mustard greens.  He often climbed up towers with bows and arrows, and whenever he had a sudden thought of distrust, dislike, or anger at a person, he would kill that person personally.  If any of his officials looked at him in a gazing manner, he would gouge out their eyes.  Anyone who laughed frivolously would have their lips sliced open with knives.  Anyone who dared to offer a contrary opinion would first have his tongue cut out and then head cut off.

In 424, for reasons lost to history, Helian Bobo decided to depose Crown Prince Gui and appoint another son, Helian Lun (赫連倫) the Duke of Jiuquan, a crown prince.  Upon hearing this news, Helian Gui commanded his troops north from Chang'an and attacked Helian Lun.  Their forces met at Gaoping, and Helian Gui defeated and killed Helian Lun.  However, Helian Lun's brother Helian Chang then made a surprise attack on Helian Gui, killing him and seizing his troops, leading them back to Tongwan.  Helian Bobo was pleased and created Helian Chang crown prince.

In summer 425, Helian Bobo died.  Helian Chang succeeded him.

Personal information 

 Father
 Liu Weichen (劉衛臣), Xiongnu chief, posthumously honored as Emperor Huan
 Mother
 Lady Fu, posthumously honored as Empress Huanwen
 Wives
 Lady Poduoluo (破多罗夫人), daughter of Xianbei chief Mo Yigan (沒奕干)
 Empress Liang (created 414)
 Children
 Helian Gui (赫連璝), the Crown Prince (appointed 414, killed in battle by Helian Chang 424)
 Helian Yan (赫連延), the Duke of Yangping (appointed 414)
 Helian Chang (赫連昌), initially the Duke of Taiyuan (appointed 414), later Crown Prince (appointed 424), later emperor
 Helian Lun (赫連倫), the Duke of Jiuquan (appointed 414, killed in battle by Helian Gui 424)
 Helian Ding (赫連定), initially the Duke of Pingyuan (appointed 414), later the Prince of Pingyuan, later emperor
 Helian Man (赫連滿), the Duke of Henan (appointed 414, killed by Northern Wei forces 427)
 Helian An (赫連安), the Duke of Zhongshan (appointed 414)
 Helian Zhuxing (赫連助興)
 Helian Weiyidai (赫連謂以代)
 Helian Shegan (赫連社干), the Duke of Shanggu
 Helian Duluogu (赫連度洛孤), the Duke of Guangyang
 Helian Wushiba (赫連烏視拔), the Duke of Danyang
 Helian Tugu (赫連禿骨), the Duke of Wuling
 Princess, later Empress Helian of Emperor Taiwu of Northern Wei
 Princess, later consort of Emperor Taiwu of Northern Wei
 Princess, later consort of Emperor Taiwu of Northern Wei

Notes

References
 Book of Wei, v.95
 Book of Jin, v.130
 Zizhi Tongjian, v.114-120

Xia (Sixteen Kingdoms) emperors
381 births
425 deaths
Later Qin generals
People from Ordos City
Generals from Inner Mongolia
Founding monarchs